Bacșiș (Iosef) Roxana Denisa (born ) is a Romanian female volleyball player, playing as an opposite. She is part of the Romania women's national volleyball team.

She competed at the 2015 European Games in Baku and at the 2015 Women's European Volleyball Championship. 
On club level she plays for CSM Bucarest in 2015.

References

External links
 Profile at rovolleyagency.ro

1988 births
Living people
Romanian women's volleyball players
Place of birth missing (living people)
European Games competitors for Romania
Volleyball players at the 2015 European Games